Vincent Villafranca (born January 25, 1969) is an American sculptor. He creates bronze sculptures ranging from traditional wildlife imagery to futuristic science-fiction-based imagery.

Biography

Early life and education
Vincent Villafranca was born January 25, 1969, in Monterey, California and spent his early years in Venezuela, Mexico and Del Rio, Texas. Even at a young age, Vincent used his unique imagination to create works of art out of common items. Vincent would paint, sketch and create small sculptures as a child.  Much of his early work was influenced by television and film, particularly westerns and science-fiction films.  He earned a B.A. in History from Southwest Texas State University in 1994 and apprenticed at Michael Hall's Studio Foundry during his final year of undergraduate studies.

Career
Vincent has worked extensively with David Iles of Bolivar Bronze in Bolivar, Texas.

In 2009, Vincent created the physical bronze sculpture used as the Bradbury Award (full name "Ray Bradbury Award for Outstanding Dramatic Presentation"). This award is presented annually by the Science Fiction and Fantasy Writers of America as part of the Nebula Awards ceremony.

In 2013, Vincent designed and produced the Hugo Awards for the 71st World Science Fiction Convention.

In 2016, the new World Fantasy Award was debuted. Vincent designed the award and creates the trophies every year. The trophy is that of a leafless tree in front of a full moon and replaced the bust of H. P. Lovecraft whose rampant racism made many uncomfortable. World Fantasy decided a new award would honor the winners and Villafranca's design was chosen as the new trophy.

Marriage and children
Vincent Villafranca and Michelle Mitchell were married in Hays, Texas.

Awards
2006: Best 3-D Art, World Fantasy Convention, "The Poacher's Nightmare"
2007: Body of Work, World Fantasy Convention
2008: Chesley Award, Best 3-D Art, "A Conscious Entity & Its Maker"
2008: Jurors' Award, World Science Fiction Convention, "The Celestial Itinerant"
 2009: Chesley Award, Best 3-D Art, "Otherworldly Procession" (Bronze)
2010: Chesley Award, Best 3-D Art, "The Switching Hour"
2012: Chesley Award, Best 3-D Art, "Robo-Bike"

References

External links
Villafranca Sculpture

1969 births
Living people
Sculptors from Texas
Texas State University alumni
Science fiction artists
American artists